Cyperus aster is a species of sedge that is native to eastern parts of Africa.

See also 
 List of Cyperus species

References 

aster
Plants described in 1936
Flora of Tanzania
Flora of Madagascar
Taxa named by Georg Kükenthal